Are We Really Happy With Who We Are Right Now? is the second full-length album by the rock band Moneen.

Track listing

Personnel

Kenny Bridges - vocals, guitar, design, layout
Erik Hughes - bass guitar, additional vocals
Chris Hughes - guitar, additional vocals
Peter Krpan - drums
Trever Keith - production, additional vocals
Chad Blinman - recording, mixing, "string sounds"
Joe Gastwirt - mastering
Erich Gobel - mixing assistant
Lisa Logutenkow - additional vocals
Keath Moon - layout, design
Matt Daley - additional artwork

References

Moneen albums
2003 albums